Radio broadcasting has been the most popular form of mass media in Afghanistan since 1925, which is mostly in Dari and Pashto languages. Afghanistan currently has over 200 AM, FM and shortwave radio stations. The following is an incomplete list of radio stations in Afghanistan:

International localized
Afghanistan International AM 999 / 7600
All India Radio (AIR) in Pashto and Dari
BBC World Service FM 89.0 in Pashto and Dari languages
China Radio International in Pashto
Deutsche Welle (DW) in Pashto and Dari
IRIB World Service in Pashto and Dari
Radio Azadi FM 100.5 in Kabul
Radio Free Afghanistan (RFA) in Pashto and Dari
Radio Saudi International in Pashto
TRT World in Pashto and Dari
Voice of America (VOA) in Pashto and Dari language
Voice of Tajik in Dari

National
Ariana FM 93.5, commercial
Arman FM 98.1, commercial
Radio Afghanistan, public
Salam Watandar FM 98.9, commercial

Regional

Radio Srood
Saba Radio 
Radio Nawa FM 103.1
Afghan Ghag FM 106.1
Radio Cheenar FM 89.8 Khost
Paktia Ghag Radio station FM 94.2
De Paktia De Shezo ghag Radio FM 88.2
Radio Youth FM 97.5
Kabul Rock FM 108.0 in Kabul
Radio Aryana FM 93.5 in Kabul
Spogmai FM FM 102.2 in Kabul
Radio kILID FM 87.5 in Kabul
Radio Hamisha Bahar fm 90.6 Nangarhar province
Radio FM 89.4 in Kabul
Radio Shaher FM 95.5 in Kabul
Radio Nakhter FM 90.7 in Assadabad, Kunar Province
Radio Zala FM 89.2 in Kunar Province
Radio Zala FM 92.1 In Nangarhar Province Jalalabad
Radio Turkmen FM 92.9 in Jowzjan province
Radio Helmand Medium Wave 6KW and 2.5KW FM transmission equipment
Radio Watandar Upgrade to 2.5KW in Kabul
Radio Maiwand 92.7
Radio Mowj  105.5
Radio Alim 
Radio Mojdah Herat 91.3
Radio Baraan Harat 
Radio Watandar Harat 87.5
Radio Maherr Mazar e Sharif 
Radio Waranga in Kandahar 
Radio Samoon Helmand 
Radio Safa 89.7 Nangarhar 
Radio Muska Helmand
Radio Sharq Upgrade 91.3
Radio Nargis 92.4
Radio Zala Kunar with Three FM Repeater system 
Radio Muram Jalalabad 97.8
Radio Abasin Jalalabad 91.8
Radio NAN Jalalabad  99.9
Radio Nary Kunar 89.2
Radio Nuristan in Kalagush 89.00
Radio NAN Khost 89.2
Radio Zanat Logar 
Radio Dunya Parwan 105.5
Radio Paiwastoon Urzgan 
Radio Enikass FM 97.1 in Jalalabad
Radio Bost FM Helmand  
Radio Hamesha Bahar  90.6
Radio TOLO Khorshid Parwan
Radio Awashtoon Paktia 88.8
Radio Talwasa Am 945
Radio Kahkashan
Radio Amaan GHAG jalalabad  96.9
Radio Hamasa Qondoz 
Radio Omid Farda Takhar 91.5
Radio Eslah Mazer e Sharif 104.3
Radio Eslah poli khumri 104.3
Radio Nan FM paktia  
Radio Ansar Herat 97.11
Radio Zama Kandahar 89.1
Radio Taroon Ghaag Urozgaan 88.5
Pakhtoonistan FM Nangarhar
Radio Gorbat (GRTV) 107,7 FM
Radio Tanin 89.7FM

See also
Communications in Afghanistan

References

External links

Afghanistan